Rajashree is an Indian name.

People 
 Rajashree Choudhury (born 1965), Indian-born founder of USA Yoga and International Yoga Sports Federation
 Rajashree (novelist), Indian novelist and filmmaker
 Rajashree (actress), Tamil film actress
 Rajasree (born 1945), also known as RajaSri, noted South Indian film actress of the 1960s
 Rajshree (born 1944), Indian actress who has acted in Hindi films
 Rajasri (1934–1994), famous dialogue and lyrics writer and Music director in Telugu cinema industry
 Rajshree Pathy, eminent entrepreneur from Coimbatore, Tamil Nadu, India
 Rajshree Thakur (born 1981), Indian actress best known for her role as Saloni in the Hindi television drama Saat Phere
 Rajshree Ojha (born 1976), Indian film director and story writer